Corraleehanbeg is a townland in the civil parish of Drumreilly, barony of Tullyhaw, County Cavan, Ireland.

Geography

Corraleehanbeg is bounded on the north by Garryfliugh townland, on the south by Kilnamaddyroe townland, on the west by Knockfin and Prabagh townlands and on the east by Clogher, Drumcroman and Drumderg townlands. Its chief geographical features are the hill that the townland is named after which reaches a height of 392 feet, forestry plantations, mountain streams, a lime-kiln and dug wells. It is traversed by minor public roads and rural lanes. The townland covers 155 statute acres.

History

The landlord of the townland in the 19th century was the Beresford Estate.

The Tithe Applotment Books for 1834 spells the name as Coralehanbeg and list six tithepayers in the townland.

Griffith's Valuation of 1857 lists five landholders in the townland.

On 14 June 1880, Philip Meehan, a resident of Coraleehanbeg, was shot dead by Henry Acheson.

Census

In the 1901 census of Ireland, there were six families listed in the townland.

In the 1911 census of Ireland, there were seven families listed in the townland.

Antiquities

 A medieval earthen ringfort. The 'Archaeological Inventory of County Cavan' (Dublin: Stationery Office, 1995) states- Raised circular area (int. diam. 30m) enclosed by a much-denuded earthen bank and slight remains of a fosse. Break in bank at NE represents original entrance. Planted with coniferous trees in 1988.
 Stone bridges over the streams

References

External links
The IreAtlas Townland Data Base

Townlands of County Cavan